The UA5 experiment was the first experiment conducted at the Proton-Antiproton Collider (SpS), a collider using the infrastructure of the Super Proton Synchrotron (SPS). The experiment was approved in February 1979, as a collaboration between CERN and the universities of Bonn, Brussels, Cambridge and Stockholm. The spokesperson of the UA5 collaboration was John Rushbrooke.

The object of the experiment was to investigate Centauro events and more generally to perform a first rapid visual survey of the energy region afforded by the then new SPS collider. Measurements were done on proton-antiproton collisions of 540 GeV center-of-mass energy, with the results being published in November 1983. Later, under the name of UA5/2, data was recorded from 900 GeV collisions. No indication of Centauro production was observed, but an upper limit on the production was obtained.

The experimental setup consisted of two large streamer chambers which were placed above and below the SpS beam pipe. The chambers were triggered by requiring hits in scintillation counters at each end. This trigger rejected essentially all elastic and diffractive elements. The streamer chamber tracks were photographed by six cameras, and the tracks were measured, reconstructed and analyzed.

See also
List of Super Proton Synchrotron experiments
UA1 experiment
UA2 experiment

References

External links
List of publications from the UA5 Collaboration
CERN-UA-05 experiment record on INSPIRE-HEP

Particle experiments
CERN experiments